K-131 was a Project 675 (NATO reporting name Echo II-class submarine) of the Soviet Navy's Northern Fleet, she was also redesignated K-192.

Design and description
The Echo II class was a nuclear-powered cruise-missile submarine, which could carry up to eight anti-ship missiles, designed to strike any aircraft carrier-borne nuclear threat. The missiles could be either conventional or nuclear and all eight fired within twenty minutes. The submarine would need to be surfaced and carried an array of electronics, radar and sonar to feed data to the missile while en route to its target. K-131 also had six  torpedo tubes forward and four  torpedo tubes aft.

She was manned by about 90 crew members.

Operational history

Fire
On 25 June 1989, while under the command of Captain First Rank E. Selivanov, K-131 suffered a catastrophic fire while on patrol in the Norwegian Sea off the Kola Peninsula.  A short circuit in an electrical switchboard in the eighth compartment ignited the clothes of an electrical officer, and spread first to other equipment in that compartment, then into the seventh compartment. Before it was extinguished, the fire had killed 13 men.

Aid
The fire affected one of the two reactors, forcing the submarine to surface. All the cooling water went into the ocean, and its radioactivity levels were unknown. The service ship Amur, which had a nuclear waste processing plant on board, then arrived to assist K-131. However, the heavily contaminated water caused Amurs treatment plant to break down. How much nuclear waste leaked into the ocean has never been fully verified.

Fate
After returning to the Soviet Union, K-131 was anchored in Ara Bay until 1994. Then she was towed to Russian Shipyard No. 10—Shkval. To this day the Soviet, and later Russian, navies have been unable to remove her reactors.

References

Bibliography

Echo-class submarines
Ships built in the Soviet Union
1966 ships
Cold War submarines of the Soviet Union
Maritime incidents in 1989
Soviet submarine accidents
1989 in the Soviet Union